Bob and Mike Bryan were the defending champions, but chose not to participate this year.

Florin Mergea and Aisam-ul-Haq Qureshi won the title, defeating Philipp Petzschner and Alexander Peya in the final, 6–4, 6–3.

Seeds

Draw

Draw

Qualifying

Seeds

Qualifiers
 ''' Marcus Daniell /  Marcelo Demoliner

Qualifying draw

References
 Main Draw
 Qualifying Draw

Barcelona Open Banco Sabadell - Doubles